Rina Funaki (born 10 May 1997) is a Japanese professional footballer who plays as a midfielder for WE League club MyNavi Sendai.

Club career 
Funaki made her WE League debut on 12 September 2021.

References 

Japanese women's footballers
Living people
1997 births
Women's association football midfielders
Association football people from Tokyo
Mynavi Vegalta Sendai Ladies players
WE League players